Cell Project Space is a not-for-profit gallery space and workspace provider based in Cambridge Heath, East London. Cell Project Space presents up to 5 exhibitions and 3-4 events per year and supports the dissemination of artists’ knowledge to the local community through workshops.

History 
Cell Project Space is an independent gallery founded in 1999 by directors Milika Muritu and Richard Priestley that was originally set up as an artist-run exhibition space and is now a registered charity, Cell Foundation. The organisation provides affordable workspace, which in turn supports an on-going programme of exhibitions, projects, talks, screenings, and events. The programme facilitates local and global critical debates while supporting underrepresented artists, collaborating with established and emerging practitioners to present varied formats for exhibition making. Cell extends the gallery’s visibility with collective participation through tours and workshops for local secondary schools and the wider community.

Cell Project Space and Studios, established in 1999, and charity arm Cell Foundation, founded in 2014, are an affordable artists work space providing leasehold work space to 1097 artists and designer-makers at 7 sites / 147,000 sq ft of B1 work space in east and South East London. As an independent not for profit gallery all funds raised are used solely for the development of artists’ projects and the gallery’s public programme.

Programme 
Cell Project Space runs a regular programme of exhibitions, talks & events. Past solo exhibitions include Anna-Sophie Berger, Rosa Aiello & Patricia L. Boyd, Emanuel Almborg, Alan Michael, Dorota Gawęda & Eglė Kulbokaitė, Angharad Williams & Mathis Gasser, Julia Crabtree & William Evans, Mimosa Echard, Jenna Bliss & Gili Tal, Ghislaine Leung, Josh Bitelli, Barbara T. Smith, Yuri Pattison, Rachel Reupke, Peles Empire, Laura Buckley, Anne de Vries, Mark Aerial Waller, Iain Ball, Angelo Plessas, Benedict Drew, Eddie Peake, Jessica Warboys, Celia Hempton, Natalie Dray and Celine Condorelli.

The programme has received numerous reviews and press coverage in Art Forum, AQNB, Frieze, Art Monthly, Mousse, The Guardian, Dazed, Studio International and Art Review.

Studios 

Cell Project Space leases 7 commercial buildings across London, which have been converted into affordable artists’ studios. This generates funds that are used to run the programme in the exhibition space located on Cambridge Heath Road. This also allows support for the internship and educational programmes at the gallery.

Management structure 

Board of Trustees

 Richard Priestley (2014–present)
 Milika Muritu (2014–present)
 James Chesterman (2016–present)
 Femke Oortwijn (2014–16)

Directors

 Milika Muritu, Gallery Programme Curator (1999–present)
 Richard Priestley, Studios Development (1999–present)

Staff

 Head of Studios Operations: Adam Greenhalgh (2020–present)
 Studios Administrator Matt Nelmes(2020–present)
 Associate Curator: Adomas Narkevičius (2021–present)
 Gallery Manager: Jessie Krish (2021–present)
 Studio & Gallery Technician: Linas Develis (2015–present)
 Gallery Assistant: Katrina Nzegwu (2022–present)
 Associate Curator: Eliel Jones (2020-2021)
 Gallery Manager  & Public Programmes Coordinator: Rachael Davies (2016–2020)
 Associate Curator: Tim Steer (2016–2019)
 Studio Operations Manager: Dominic Williams (2014–2020)
 Studios Management: Huw Chadbourn (2012-2016)
 Gallery Manager: Femke Oortwijn (2009-2016)

References

External links 
 Official website

Cambridge Heath
Contemporary art galleries in London
Art galleries established in 2000